Vuntut Gwitchin is an electoral district which returns a member (known as an MLA) to the Legislative Assembly of Yukon in Canada. It is one of the Yukon's eight rural seats.

The electoral district was known as Old Crow, named after the community it encompasses, before 1992. In the 1974 election and the 1970 election, the riding was part of Ogilvie and Dawson, respectively.

It is the least populated electoral district in any provincial or territorial legislature in Canada, with fewer than 200 total ballots cast in any territorial election to date. In two elections since the district's creation, in 1996 and 2021, two candidates finished in an exact tie; under Yukon election law, a tied vote is settled by drawing lots rather than by reconducting a full by-election.

Members of the Legislative Assembly

Election results

2021 general election
As both candidates each received 78 votes, it resulted in a tie. A judicial recount took place and there remained a tie vote, therefore a random draw determined that Annie Blake would fill the seat.

|-
 
| style="width: 130px" |NDP
|Annie Blake
|align="right"| 78
|align="right"| 50.0%
|align="right"| +48.0%

| style="width: 130px" |Liberal
|Pauline Frost
|align="right"| 78
|align="right"| 50.0%
|align="right"| -1.3%
|- bgcolor="white"
!align="left" colspan=3|Total
!align="right"| 156
!align="right"| 100.0%
!align="right"| –

2016 general election

|-
 
| style="width: 130px" |Liberal
|Pauline Frost
|align="right"| 77
|align="right"| 51.3%
|align="right"| -12.8%

|NDP
|Skeeter Miller-Wright
|align="right"| 3
|align="right"| 2.0%
|align="right"| +2.0%
|- bgcolor="white"
!align="left" colspan=3|Total
!align="right"| 150
!align="right"| 100.0%
!align="right"| –

2011 general election

|-
 
| style="width: 130px" |Liberal
|Darius Elias
|align="right"| 93
|align="right"| 64.1%
|align="right"|+18.1%

|- bgcolor="white"
!align="left" colspan=3|Total
!align="right"| 145
!align="right"| 100.0%
!align="right"| –

2006 general election

|-
 
| style="width: 130px" |Liberal
|Darius Elias
|align="right"|65
|align="right"|45.8%
|align="right"|+22.0%

|NDP
|Lorraine Peter
|align="right"|40
|align="right"|28.2%
|align="right"|-19.3%

|- bgcolor="white"
!align="left" colspan=3|Total
!align="right"|142
!align="right"|100.0%
!align="right"| –

2002 general election

|-

|NDP
|Lorraine Peter
|align="right"|68
|align="right"|47.5%
|align="right"|+9.8%

 
| style="width: 130px" |Liberal
|Joe Tetlichi
|align="right"|34
|align="right"|23.8%
|align="right"|-9.5%
|- bgcolor="white"
!align="left" colspan=3|Total
!align="right"|143
!align="right"|100.0%
!align="right"| –

2000 general election

|-

|NDP
|Lorraine Netro
|align="right"|69
|align="right"|37.7%
|align="right"|-17.3%
 
| style="width: 130px" |Liberal
|Esau Schafer
|align="right"|61
|align="right"|33.3%
|align="right"| +33.3%

|- bgcolor="white"
!align="left" colspan=3|Total
!align="right"|183
!align="right"|100.0%
!align="right"| –

1997 by-election

|-

|NDP
|Robert Bruce
|align="right"|88
|align="right"|55.0%
|align="right"|+13.2%

|- bgcolor="white"
!align="left" colspan=3|Total
!align="right"|160
!align="right"|100.0%
!align="right"| –

Held after a challenge of the 1996 results.

1996 general election

|-

|NDP
|Robert Bruce
|align="right"|69
|align="right"|41.8%
|align="right"|-2.4%

 
| style="width: 130px" |Liberal
|Shirlee Frost
|align="right"|27
|align="right"|16.4%
|align="right"| +16.4%
|- bgcolor="white"
!align="left" colspan=3|Total
!align="right"|165
!align="right"|100.0%
!align="right"| –

Because of the tie vote, Robert Bruce was declared elected after his name was drawn from a hat.

1996 by-election

|-

|NDP
|Randall Tetlichi
|align="right"|69
|align="right"|44.2%
|align="right"| +44.2%
|- bgcolor="white"
!align="left" colspan=3|Total
!align="right"|156
!align="right"|100.0%
!align="right"| –

Held on the death of Johnny Abel, 1995.

1992 general election

|-

 
| Liberal
| Grafton Njootli
| align="right"| 56
| align="right"| 36.8%
| align="right"| –
|-
! align=left colspan=3 |Total 
! align="right"| 152
! align="right"| 100.0%
! align="right"| –

References

Yukon territorial electoral districts